The North American Society for Serbian Studies is a non-profit scholarly organization based in North America, founded in 1978, aimed at promoting research and forward Serbian studies and increasing public awareness and understanding of Serbia and its culture and people, including the Serbian diaspora. It is a member of the Association for Slavic, East European, and Eurasian Studies (ASEEES). It publishes the peer-reviewed journal Serbian Studies.

History
Slovenian scholar Rado Lenček (1921–2005), a member of the Serbian Academy of Sciences and Arts (SANU) and the founder of the Society for Slovene Studies, suggested to his Serbian colleagues to establish the NASSS, whose member he became.

References

External links

Academic organizations based in the United States
Historical societies of the United States
1978 establishments in the United States
Organizations established in 1978
Scientific organizations established in 1978
Serbian studies
Serbian diaspora
Serbian-American culture
Serbian-Canadian culture